Dirk van Hogendorp (3 October 1761: Heenvliet – 29 October 1822: Rio de Janeiro), comte de l'Empire, was a Dutch officer and secretary of War. In 1812 he was governor of Vilnius, in 1813 he was appointed as the governor of Hamburg.

Early life

In the Prussian Army 
Van Hogendorp the brother of Gijsbert Karel van Hogendorp, in their youth both trained as soldiers in Prussia (1773–1783).

In the Dutch East Indies 
Van Hogendorp joined the navy and was stationed in the Dutch Indies. In 1786 he became the resident assistant in Bengal and later resident on Java. He sharply criticized VOC rule on Java for its 'feudal' exactions from the population. He proposed extensive changes to the structure of government and finance on Java, including property rights for the Javanese, transforming the 'bupati' into a salaried bureaucracy, and reforming the taxation system, many of which foreshadowed the ideas of Daendels and Raffles. In 1798 he was jailed for these views by the conservative commissioner-general S.C. Nederburgh but in 1799 escaped on a Danish ship to the Netherlands where he continued his campaign in a series of polemic brochures, in 1803 joining a committee ordered to dismantle the Dutch East India Company.

Critique of the colonial government
Van Hogendorp is most known for a critique of the colonial government in the Dutch Indies which drew on the ideas of French liberalism then in vogue. This report, commonly known as the 'Bericht', was published in 1799 after van Hogendorp had spent some 15 years as a navy officer and an administrator in the colony. During that time, he had developed ideas considered troublesome to the authorities and was arrested on account of them. He drafted the 'bericht' while on the ship that brought him back to the Netherlands after his escape from colonial custody.

The 'Bericht' argued for significant reforms of the regent system in place in Dutch Java, opposed slavery, and called for a more liberal system of government. The previous system was essentially feudal, in which indigenous regents or lords were supported by the Dutch in return for tributes. Pointing to British successes in India, van Hogendorp suggested that by redistributing land to the common Javanese 'serf', there would be much more individual incentive to work and thus increased productivity, making the colony more profitable. Under van Hogendorp's plan, the Javanese would be encouraged to plant rice as well as coffee and pepper on drier lands, the Europeans would be able to purchase or lease wastelands, and the Chinese would be allowed to lease lands under the condition that no estates were to be farmed out to them. Furthermore, forced labor would give way to fair wages for laborers, and trade for Dutchmen would be completely open except in the case of the spice and China trades.

The report, which bears some similar ideas to the ideas of Abbé Raynal, was rejected by imperial officials who believed it to radical, and who realized that the Dutch depended on the very indigenous rulers that the plan would essentially undermine. Furthermore, the Dutch held firm to the belief that the colonies exist to serve the Netherlands, not the other way around, and rejected any alternatives that would give more rights to either the natives or traders from other nations. However, the report was influential enough that van Hogendorp was able to attain a seat on the council for drafting a plan to rule Java during the reign of the governor Daendels, even though Daendels beat van Hogendorp to the appointment as the governor-general of Java, on large account of both the 'bericht' and the state of war the nation found itself in. Additionally, the report later influenced the administrative policies of Sir Stamford Raffles after the British takeover of Java, probably through his contemporary and great friend Herman Muntinghe.

Playwright: Kraspoekol
Van Hogendorp published a play entitled 'Kraspoekol', and ‘... six months after the publication of this play, with his name to it, he attempted to have it represented on the stage at The Hague, on 20 March 1801; but the East India Gentry, not thinking it proper to exhibit the most illustrious actions of themselves and their noble ancestors upon a stage to vulgar European spectators, went to the play provided with little half-penny whistles and trumpets, and kept up such a tremendous whistling and trumpeting from the very moment the curtain began to be drawn up, that not a syllable of the play could be heard - and, if these Gentlemen could, they would also have extinguished the candles, to keep in darkness what themselves and their ancestors never intended for the light. In short, the play, after being thus interrupted the whole of the first act, was broken off before the second, when the manager was obliged to give up the entertainment. The next day the ignorant part of the audience was so curious to know the secrets which these East India Gentlemen had been thus industrious to conceal, that the bookseller (as he told me himself) sold infinitely more copies of the play that day than all he had sold the whole of the preceding six months, and had he ten times more, they would not have answered the numerous demands.’

Career with Napoleon
Getting into trouble again he became a diplomat in St Petersburg (1802–1805) and Vienna, Berlin and Madrid. In between he was the secretary of war in Holland (1807) under Louis Bonaparte. In 1810 he was appointed as general in the Grande Armée and aide-de-camp of Napoleon Bonaparte.

Napoleon's invasion of Russia 

On 1 July 1812 he was appointed as governor of East Prussia and Lithuania organizing hospitals for the wounded in Vilnius and supplies for the army. 

In early December 1812, Louis Henri Loison was sent with a reserve division of 10,000 newly drafted German and Italian boys to help extricate the remains of the Grand Army in its retreat. Either Van Hogendorp or Joachim Murat stupidly ordered him to defend the road to Smurgainys. At night-time, the soldiers were camping on the ground and the temperature dropped to minus 35 degrees Celsius, which proved catastrophic for them. Within a few days, a division of 15,000 soldiers was wiped out without a fight.

After the Napoleonic Wars 
After the Battle of Waterloo Van Hogendorp was mentioned in Napoleon's last will. Van Hogendorp, not allowed to return to Holland, moved in 1816 to Brazil, then part of the United Kingdom of Portugal, Brazil and the Algarves. Van Hogendorp lived his last years on a small plantation operated by enslaved people owned by van Hogendorp, growing coffee and oranges.

References

Notes

Bibliography
 Bastin, J. Indonesië, jaargang 7, 1953/1954, blz. 80.

External links
  http://www.parlement.com/9291000/biof/17104
 NAPOLEON'S LITHUANIAN FORCES by HENRY L. GAIDIS

1761 births
1822 deaths
Members of the Dutch Patriots faction
Dutch nobility
Dutch slave owners
People from Bernisse
Dutch military commanders of the Napoleonic Wars
Dirk
People of the Kingdom of Holland
Dutch emigrants to Brazil